Hasne Aur Hasaane Ka Tonic – Ladies Special is an Indian stand-up comedy show for ladies. It started on 18 July 2009 on Zee TV.

Concept
Hasne Aur Hasaane Ka Tonic - Ladies Special is a new standup comedy show on Zee TV that provides women a platform to project their point of view through the medium of humor. Audience has always seen women cry on screen; this time they will see them make everyone laugh.
Ladies Special is the search for ‘India’s Funniest Female Stand-Up Comedian’ and has eight contestants and three challengers.

The contestants find try to find humor in mundane stories from daily life and present a unique perspective on domestic issues, saas-bahu relationships, cricket and politics.
The contestants hail from all parts of India and are between 16 and 60 years of age. Their only qualifying criterion being their ability to evoke laughter and fun.

Format
One of the 8 contestants gets eliminated every week depending on the judges’ scores. Challengers are then called into the competition. After 8 weeks of competition, one woman will emerge as ‘India’s Funniest Woman’.

Jury
 Swapnil Joshi ... Host
 Tabassum ... Judge
 Baba Sehgal ... Judge

References

External links
Official Site on Zee TV India

Zee TV original programming
Indian reality television series
2009 Indian television series debuts
2009 Indian television series endings